Stanisław Stefański (born 24 August 1947, in Gdańsk) is a sailor from Poland. Perlicki represented his country at the 1972 Summer Olympics in Kiel. Perlicki took 8th place in the Soling with Zygfryd Perlicki as helmsman and Józef Błaszczyk as fellow crew member.

References

Living people
1947 births
Sportspeople from Gdańsk
Polish male sailors (sport)
Sailors at the 1972 Summer Olympics – Soling
Olympic sailors of Poland